Alfred Ellis may refer to:

 Alfred "Pee Wee" Ellis (1941–2021), American saxophonist, composer and arranger
 Alfred Burdon Ellis (1852–1894), British Army officer and ethnographer
 Alfred Ellis (1854–1930), English photographer
 Alfred John Ellis (1915–2020), Canadian banker
 Alfred Claude Ellis (1919–1997), schoolteacher and politician
 Ben Ellis (baseball) (Alfred Benjamin Ellis, 1870–1931), infielder in Major League Baseball